Il tabarro (The Cloak) is an opera in one act by Giacomo Puccini to an Italian libretto by Giuseppe Adami, based on 's play La houppelande. It is the first of the trio of operas known as Il trittico. The first performance was given on December 14, 1918 at the Metropolitan Opera in New York City.

Roles

Synopsis
Place: A barge on the Seine in Paris.
Time: 1910.

It is close to sunset in Paris, and the stevedores work unloading Michele's barge. Giorgetta, Michele's wife, asks her husband if she can bring wine to the workers. He agrees but does not join them because she refuses his kiss. The stevedores start dancing to the music of a nearby organ grinder and one of them steps on Giorgetta's foot. Luigi, a stevedore, dances with her, and it is evident that there is something between them. Upon hearing of Michele's return the stevedores' gathering breaks up.

Work is getting scarce and Giorgetta and Michele discuss which of the stevedores should be dismissed; she prefers that it be anyone other than Luigi despite him being Michele's first choice. Soon the conversation turns into a fight. La Frugola enters, looking for Talpa, her husband and one of the stevedores. She shows everyone the fruits of her scavenging in Paris and scolds the men for their drinking. Luigi laments his lot in life, and La Frugola sings of her wish to one day buy a house in the country where she and her husband can retire. Giorgetta and Luigi sing a duet about the town where they were both born.

The stevedores depart except for Luigi, who asks Michele to dismiss him and let him off in Rouen, but Michele convinces him against this, saying there is not enough work in Rouen. When they are alone, Giorgetta asks Luigi why he requested to be dismissed; the pair acknowledge their love. They plan to meet later that evening upon the signal of a match being lit on board. By now Luigi seems determined to kill Michele and flee with Giorgetta.

Michele later reminisces with Giorgetta of the days before their child died and how he could cover the two of them under his cloak. He is distressed about being twice her age; she comforts him but she still will not kiss him, and goes off.

Michele wonders aloud if Giorgetta is still faithful to him and ponders who might have changed her so much. He reviews the list of men who have shared in their lives but dismisses each of them as improbable. Michele lights his pipe and Luigi, seeing it from afar, thinks that it is Giorgetta's signal. He returns to the barge and is confronted by Michele. In the ensuing fight, Michele disarms Luigi and forces him to confess his affair with Giorgetta before strangling him to death and hiding Luigi's body under his cloak. Giorgetta returns to the barge, approaching him remorsefully after their fight earlier, and when she is close enough Michele opens his cloak to reveal her dead lover, Luigi's lifeless body falling on Giorgetta. Michele smothers her to death on Luigi's body.

Arias

 "Hai ben ragione! meglio non pensare" — Luigi 
 "Nulla! Silenzio!" — Michele
 "Scorri, fiume eterno" — Michele. This more contemplative aria for Michele was later replaced by Puccini with the vengeful "Nulla! Silenzio!" The Leinsdorf and Gardelli recordings both include it as an addendum.

Recordings
{| class="wikitable"
!Year
!width="160"|Cast(Michele, Giorgetta, Luigi)
!Conductor,Opera House and Orchestra
!Label<ref>[http://www.operadis-opera-discography.org.uk/CLPUTABA.HTM  Recordings of Il tabarro on operadis-opera-discography.org.uk]</ref>
|-
| 1949 || Antenore Reali,Clara Petrella,Glauco Scarlini || Giuseppe Baroni,Orchestra Lirica di Torino della RAI||Audio CD: Cetra Records
|-

| 1955 || Tito Gobbi,Margaret Mas,Giacinto Prandelli || Vincenzo Bellezza,Chorus and Orchestra of the Rome Opera House||Audio CD: EMI ClassicsCat: 5099921294921
|-
| 1962 || Robert Merrill,Renata Tebaldi,Mario del Monaco || Lamberto Gardelli,Orchestra e coro del Maggio Musicale Fiorentino ||Audio CD: Decca Cat: 000289 475 7625 9
|- 
| 1971 || Sherrill Milnes,Leontyne Price,Plácido Domingo || Erich Leinsdorf,New Philharmonia Orchestra ||Audio CD: RCA Red Seal Cat: 8985436162
|- 
| 1977 || Ingvar Wixell,Renata Scotto,Plácido Domingo || Lorin Maazel,New Philharmonia Orchestra ||Audio CD: Sony Classical Cat: 88697527292
|- 
| 1981 || Cornell MacNeil,Renata Scotto,Vasile Moldoveanu || James Levine,Metropolitan Opera orchestra and chorus ||DVD Video: MET OPERA Cat: 1000008349
|-
| 1994 || Juan Pons,Mirella Freni,Giuseppe Giacomini || Bruno Bartoletti,Orchestra e coro del Maggio Musicale Fiorentino ||Audio CD: Decca Cat: 000289 478 0341 6
|- 
| 1994 || Juan Pons,Teresa Stratas,Plácido Domingo || James Levine,Metropolitan Opera orchestra and chorus ||DVD Video: Deutsche Grammophon Cat: 000440 073 4024 0
|-
| 1997 || Carlo Guelfi,Maria Guleghina,Neil Shicoff || Antonio Pappano,London Voices & London Symphony Orchestra || Audio CD: EMI ClassicsCat: 0724355658722
|}

References
Notes

Sources
Holden, Amanda (Ed.), The New Penguin Opera Guide, New York: Penguin Putnam, 2001. 
Warrack, John and West, Ewan, The Oxford Dictionary of Opera'' New York: OUP: 1992

External links

Libretto (in Italian)
Libretto (Italian with English translation

Operas by Giacomo Puccini
One-act operas
Italian-language operas
Verismo operas
Opera world premieres at the Metropolitan Opera
1918 operas
Operas
Operas set in Paris